Behi-e Feyzolah Beygi Rural District is in the Central District of Bukan County, West Azerbaijan province, Iran. At the National Census of 2006, its population was 8,746 in 1,726 households. There were 9,477 inhabitants in 2,314 households at the following census of 2011. At the most recent census of 2016, the population of the rural district was 11,508 in 3,306 households. The largest of its 30 villages was Yengijeh, with 1,689 people.

References 

Bukan County

Rural Districts of West Azerbaijan Province

Populated places in West Azerbaijan Province

Populated places in Bukan County